Kurtis Roberts, (born 17 November 1978 in Turlock, California) is an American motorcycle road racer. He is the youngest son of three-time 500cc World Champion Kenny Roberts, and the younger brother of 2000 500cc World Champion Kenny Roberts, Jr. He has raced in most major US and international motorcycle racing championships, in both Grand Prix and Superbike categories.

AMA
In 1998 Kurtis joined Erion Honda, starting out in 250s as he had experience of this level. He was runner-up in the AMA 250cc series that year, also riding in a few 600cc Supersport races. In both 1999 and 2000 he won the AMA Formula Xtreme series, adding the 600cc Supersport in 2000. Moving to the prestigious American Honda team, his first 3 AMA Superbike Championship podium finishes came in 2001 - taking his first wins and third overall in 2003, after missing much of 2002 due to injury. 2005 was a disastrous return to Erion, despite a second place in the Daytona 200.

International
In 1997 Kurtis contested the 250cc World Championship.

In 2004 he joined his father's Proton MotoGP team, but this was uncompetitive, scoring just one point all year. In  he rode in selected Superbike World Championship rounds for the Pedercini Ducati team.

After attempting to set up an AMA team with former champion Doug Chandler he resumed his links with his father's MotoGP team for 2007, taking over from his brother when Kenny Roberts, Jr. decided the bike was not competitive enough. He took minor points in three successive rounds.

Career statistics

Grand Prix motorcycle racing

By season

Races by year

(key) (Races in bold indicate pole position; races in italics indicate fastest lap)

References

External links

 AMA career summary 

American motorcycle racers
Living people
1978 births
AMA Superbike Championship riders
250cc World Championship riders
MotoGP World Championship riders
Superbike World Championship riders